Blood of the Vikings was a five-part 2001 BBC Television documentary series that traced the legacy of the Vikings in the British Isles through a genetics survey.

Production
The series was presented by Julian Richards who has a long-held fascination with the Vikings.

Geneticist Professor David Goldstein, from University College London, lead the 15-month study that compared mouth swabs from 2,500 male volunteers from 25 different locations across the country with DNA samples from Scandinavian locals to find out how much Viking heritage remains in the UK.

The study traced the past movements of peoples to discover how many Vikings stayed after the raids.  The study of history and archaeology alone could not answer this question.

BBC Two Controller Jane Root described the station's work with UCL as a unique, nationwide project.

The research confirmed that the Vikings did not just raid and retreat to Scandinavia, but settled in Britain for years.  They left their genetic pattern in some parts of the UK population.  Concentrations of Norwegian genetic heritage were found in part of Cumbria in northwest England, the area around Penrith, the Shetland and Orkney Islands and the far north of the Scottish mainland.

In addition the research revealed surprising new information about Celtic and Anglo-Saxon heritage on the British mainland.  Men who were tested in mainland Scotland had a percentage of Celtic genetic heritage similar to the population of southern England.  This showed 1) that Celtic heritage persisted among men in southern England after Anglo-Saxon settlement; and 2) that the Scots were not predominantly Celtic.

The series included clips from Richard Fleischer's 1958 film The Vikings starring Kirk Douglas to illustrate common modern attitudes towards the Vikings.

Episodes

Companion book

External links
Blood of the Vikings Video Clips at BBC Online

References

2001 British television series debuts
2001 British television series endings
2000s British documentary television series
BBC television documentaries about history
2000s British television miniseries
Documentary television series about science
English-language television shows
Genetics in the United Kingdom
Works about genetics